Belle Plaine is a city in Benton County, Iowa, United States. The population was 2,330 at the 2020 census. It is part of the Cedar Rapids Metropolitan Statistical Area.

History
Belle Plaine was founded in 1862 when it was certain the railroad would be extended to that point.  "Belle Plaine" is derived from the French meaning "beautiful plain".

Belle Plaine is located on both the historic Lincoln Highway and the cross country tracks of the Union Pacific Railroad.

Geography

The Iowa River flows roughly southeastward, just south of the city airport.

Demographics

2010 census
As of the census of 2010, there were 2,534 people, 1,101 households, and 659 families living in the city. The racial makeup of the city was 97.8% White, 0.3% African American, 0.4% Asian, 0.7% from other races, and 0.8% from two or more races. Hispanic or Latino of any race were 1.7% of the population.

There were 1,101 households, of which 27.2% had children under the age of 18 living with them, 45.9% were married couples living together, 10.0% had a female householder with no husband present, 4.0% had a male householder with no wife present, and 40.1% were non-families. 34.5% of all households were made up of individuals, and 16.1% had someone living alone who was 65 years of age or older. The average household size was 2.26 and the average family size was 2.90.

The median age in the city was 42.8 years. 23.5% of residents were under the age of 18; 7% were between the ages of 18 and 24; 22.5% were from 25 to 44; 28.2% were from 45 to 64; and 19.1% were 65 years of age or older. The gender makeup of the city was 48.9% male and 51.1% female.

2000 census
As of the census of 2000, there were 2,878 people, 1,212 households, and 749 families living in the city. The racial makeup of the city was 98.92% White, 0.07% African American, 0.03% Native American, 0.17% Asian, 0.10% Pacific Islander, 0.07% from other races, and 0.63% from two or more races. Hispanic or Latino of any race were 0.66% of the population.

There were 1,212 households, out of which 29.9% had children under the age of 18 living with them, 49.5% were married couples living together, 8.0% had a female householder with no husband present, and 38.2% were non-families. 33.9% of all households were made up of individuals, and 20.6% had someone living alone who was 65 years of age or older. The average household size was 2.32 and the average family size was 2.97.

25.7% are under the age of 18, 7.2% from 18 to 24, 26.6% from 25 to 44, 19.6% from 45 to 64, and 20.8% who were 65 years of age or older. The median age was 39 years. For every 100 females, there were 95.3 males. For every 100 females age 18 and over, there were 86.3 males.

The median income for a household in the city was $36,316, and the median income for a family was $47,105. Males had a median income of $31,750 versus $24,966 for females. The per capita income for the city was $16,321. About 3.3% of families and 7.0% of the population were below the poverty line, including 5.3% of those under age 18 and 10.6% of those age 65 or over.

Government
The mayor of Belle Plaine is David Fish. The City Administrator is Stephen Beck. Jacki McDermott is the City Clerk. Lance Hinschberger is the Park and Rec Director. Kris Hudson is the Police Chief. Russ Spading is the Fire Chief.

Education
The Belle Plaine Community School District provides education services to the Belle Plaine area.  The district is one of three school districts serving Benton County.  Belle Plaine High School and the junior high school are co-located.  Longfellow Elementary school provides pre-K through 6th grade education.

Infrastructure
Iowa Highway 21 passes through Belle Plaine providing north to south travel from Waterloo to Hedrick and connections with both state and US east to west highways, U.S. Highway 30 north of town and Iowa Highway 212 south of town.

The railroad provides east to west freight service to the city.

The city airport is located on the south side of the town.

Notable people

 George Alexander,  28th Mayor of Los Angeles; lived several years in Belle Plaine.
 Marjorie Cameron, artist, occultist, actress, and wife of rocket pioneer and occultist Jack Parsons.
 Steve Carl, mixed martial artist.
 William Dana Ewart, invented and patented the linked belt.
 Henry B. Tippie, businessman in the NYSE Hall of Fame was born Belle Plaine
 Tom McLaury, outlaw cowboy; grew up in Belle Plaine.
 Earl Moran, 20th century pin-up and glamour artist was born in Belle Plaine in 1893.
 Hap Moran, New York Giants football star, was born in Belle Plaine in 1901.
 Lonnie Nielsen, professional golfer, was born in Belle Plaine in 1953.
 Frank Wearne, raced seven times in the Indianapolis 500
 Rod Rust, former New England Patriots Head Coach coached Belle Plain High School in 1954-1955
 Henry Tippie, businessman, was born in Belle Plaine

References

External links

 
Official City Website

 
Cities in Benton County, Iowa
Cities in Iowa
Cedar Rapids, Iowa metropolitan area
1862 establishments in Iowa
Populated places established in 1862